Fayyaz Ahmed (born 12 May 1983) is a Pakistani-born cricketer who played for the United Arab Emirates national cricket team. He made his One Day International debut for the United Arab Emirates against Afghanistan in the 2014 ACC Premier League on 2 May 2014. He made his Twenty20 International debut against the Netherlands in the 2015 ICC World Twenty20 Qualifier tournament on 12 July 2015.

References

External links
 

1983 births
Living people
Emirati cricketers
United Arab Emirates One Day International cricketers
United Arab Emirates Twenty20 International cricketers
People from Gujrat District
Pakistani emigrants to the United Arab Emirates
Pakistani expatriate sportspeople in the United Arab Emirates